Gwynllŵg was a kingdom of mediaeval Wales and later a Norman lordship and then a cantref.

Location
It was named after Gwynllyw, its 5th century or 6th century ruler and consisted of the coastal plain stretching between the Rhymney and Usk rivers, together with the hills to the north.  It was traditionally regarded as part of the kingdom of Glamorgan, rather than that of Gwent which extended only as far westwards as the River Usk.  However, under the Laws in Wales Acts of 1535–42, the hundred was included with those situated to the east, to form the new county of Monmouthshire.

Wentloog and St. Woolos
The name Gwynllŵg became a marcher lordship (alternatively called Newport).  The name survives as 'Wentloog' in the Wentloog hundred and in villages on the coastal plain such as Peterstone Wentloog and St Brides Wentloog. The name Pillgwenlly for a district of central Newport also contains a corrupted version of this name. The Caldicot and Wentloog Levels also take their name from the hundred.

The Cathedral at Newport is dedicated to Gwynllyw (corrupted to St. Woolos). The name survives as 'St. Woolos' as the general locality around the Cathedral.

Notes

Cantrefs
History of Newport, Wales
Kingdoms of Wales
History of Monmouthshire
Marcher lordships
States and territories established in the 5th century